Neil Forbes Davidson, Baron Davidson of Glen Clova  (born 13 September 1950) is a Scottish lawyer and former Advocate General for Scotland.

Background
Davidson was born to John and Flora Davidson, and was educated at the University of Stirling (BA), the University of Bradford (MSc) and the University of Edinburgh (LLB, LLM), and was admitted to the Faculty of Advocates in 1979. His private practice is in commercial and administrative law.

Career
Davidson was admitted to the Faculty of Advocates in 1979, and appointed Standing Junior Counsel to the Registrar General in 1982, and the Department of Health and Social Security in 1988. He was called to the Bar of England and Wales at the Inner Temple in 1990, and appointed Queen's Counsel in Scotland in 1993. From 1993 to 2000, he was a Director of City Disputes Panel, a private dispute resolution service, and on 24 February 2000 was appointed Solicitor General for Scotland, which office he held until November 2001. He is a member of 11 King's Bench Walk Chambers, founded by former Lord Chancellor Lord Irvine of Lairg.

On 21 March 2006, it was announced that the Prime Minister, Tony Blair, had appointed him to the office of Advocate General for Scotland,  which had been vacant since the resignation of Lynda Clark, Baroness Clark of Calton on 18 January that year to take up office as a Senator of the College of Justice. He was created a life peer, as Baron Davidson of Glen Clova, of Glen Clova in Angus, on 22 March, and sits on the Labour benches. Following Labour's defeat in the 2010 general election, Davidson was succeeded in the post by Liberal Democrat Jim Wallace, former Deputy First Minister of Scotland.

Davidson is the co-author of Judicial Review in Scotland (1986). He was the International Commission of Jurists' chef de mission to Egypt on sequestration of the Egyptian Bar in 1998. He was the convener of the Human Rights Committee of the Faculty of Advocates.

In 2005, Davidson was appointed by the UK government to head a review examining the implementation of European Union legislation in the UK. The report – known as the 'Davidson Review' – was issued in 2006 and recommended a series of measures to simplify implementation, including a ban on 'gold-plating'.

Tibet visit 
In August 2014, Davidson attended the Fourth Forum on Development of Tibet in Lhasa, Tibet as a guest of the Chinese government. Chinese state media reported comments by him praising China's work in Tibet and criticising Western media. The conference organisers published a "Lhasa Consensus" document  supporting the position and policy of the Chinese government regarding Tibet. According to the document, it was endorsed by all participants in the forum.

Shortly after, a number of Western participants disassociated themselves from the 'Consensus', stating that they were unaware it would be represented as having their support. Lord Davidson did not respond to Western media enquiries regarding the accuracy of the comments attributed to him and seeking clarification of his position regarding the Lhasa Consensus. His participation, reported comments and subsequent refusal to make further comment were strongly criticised by Free Tibet, who noted that during his visit to Tibet, security forces fired on a demonstration in another region of Tibet, fatally injuring four protesters.

See also 
List of Scottish Executive Ministerial Teams

References

1950 births
Davidson of Glen Clova
Davidson, Neil, Baron Davidson of Glen Clova
Solicitors General for Scotland
Scottish King's Counsel
20th-century King's Counsel
Alumni of the University of Edinburgh
Alumni of the University of Bradford
Alumni of the University of Stirling
Living people
Davidson, Neil, Baron Davidson of Glen Clova
Advocates General for Scotland
Life peers created by Elizabeth II